This list of military awards and decorations of the Gulf War is an index to articles about notable military awards and decorations given during and after the Persian Gulf War of 1990 and 1991 by the militaries of the countries involved.

Coalition forces
Argentina
International Operations Medal with Golfo Pérsico clasp
Australia
Australian Active Service Medal with Kuwait clasp
Bahrain 
Medal for the Liberation of Kuwait
Canada
Gulf and Kuwait Medal
Egypt 
Kuwait Liberation Medal (Egypt)
Italy
Commemorative Cross for the Operations in the Persian Gulf 1990-91 (Croce commemorativa per le operazioni militari nell'area del Golfo Persico)
Norway
Medal for Defence Service Abroad - Saudi Arabia
Kuwait
Kuwait Liberation Medal (Wisam Al-Tahrir)
This medal was offered to other members of the Coalition forces
Saudi Arabia
Medal for the Liberation of Kuwait (Nut Tahrir Al-Kuwait)
This medal was offered to other members of the Coalition forces
United Arab Emirates 
Medal for the Liberation of Kuwait (Wisam al-Tahrir al-Kuwait)
United Kingdom
Gulf Medal
United States
Southwest Asia Service Medal

Iraq
Iraq
Nut Al-Shuja'ah (Bravery Medal), 1990-1991
Wisam 'Um Al-M’aarik (Mother of Battles Medal), 1990-91
Sharat 'Um Al-M'aarik  (Mother of Battles Badge)

References

Awards and decorations
Military awards and decorations
military awards and decorations of the Gulf War
Gulf War